Sweden competed at the 1972 Winter Olympics in Sapporo, Japan.

Medalists

Alpine skiing

Men

Men's slalom

Women

Biathlon

Men

 1 One minute added per close miss (a hit in the outer ring), two minutes added per complete miss.

Men's 4 x 7.5 km relay

 2 A penalty loop of 200 metres had to be skied per missed target.

Bobsleigh

Cross-country skiing

Men

Men's 4 × 10 km relay

Women

Women's 3 × 5 km relay

Figure skating

Women

Ice hockey

Summary

First round
Winners (in bold) entered the medal round. Other teams played a consolation round for 7th-11th places.

|}

Medal round

Sweden 5–1 USA
USSR 3–3 Sweden
Sweden 5–3 Poland
Czechoslovakia 2–1 Sweden
Finland 4–3 Sweden

Nordic combined 

Events:
 normal hill ski jumping 
 15 km cross-country skiing

Ski jumping

Speed skating

Men

Women

References
 Olympic Winter Games 1972, full results by sports-reference.com

Nations at the 1972 Winter Olympics
1972
Winter Olympics